, born , is a former Japanese actress, voice actress and singer affiliated with Actors Seven. She is best known for playing the title character in the long-running Doraemon anime series. She is also well known as the voice of Monokuma, the main villain from the Danganronpa video-game series. She played him in both the video games and in the anime series Danganronpa: The Animation.

It was reported on May 13, 2015, that Ōyama was living with dementia, putting any future work on hold. This notably prevented her from reprising her role as Monokuma in any further episodes of the anime series Danganronpa 3: The End of Hope's Peak High School. Her ongoing role of Monokuma was taken over by  Tarako.

Filmography

Anime

Film

Video games

Other dubbing

References

External links 
 Official agency profile 
 

1933 births
Living people
Doraemon
Japanese chefs
Japanese video game actresses
Japanese voice actresses
People from Shibuya
Voice actresses from Tokyo
People with dementia